Metal Gear is a series of video games created by Hideo Kojima.

Metal Gear may also refer to:

 Gear, a rotating machine part
 Metal Gear (mecha), bipedal tanks that appear throughout the various Metal Gear video games, acting as the namesake of the series
 Metal Gear (video game), the first entry in the Metal Gear series of video games
 Metal Gear (film), a film adaptation of the game series sharing the same name, which is currently in development